Danil Nikolaevich Romantsev (Романцев Даниил Николаевич; born June 5, 1993) is a Russian professional ice hockey player. He is currently playing with Avtomobilist Yekaterinburg of the Kontinental Hockey League (KHL).

Playing career
Romantsev made his KHL debut playing with Lokomotiv Yaroslavl during the 2013–14 KHL season.

Romantsev briefly returned to Yaroslavl in a paper trade before returning to Amur Khabarovsk on May 16, 2017, Kapustin in exchange for Alexander Yelesin and Kirill Kapustin.

He played three seasons with HC Sibir Novosibirsk before leaving the club as a free agent following the 2020–21 season. On 7 May 2021, Romantsev agreed to a two-year contract with Avtomobilist Yekaterinburg.

References

External links

1993 births
Living people
Amur Khabarovsk players
Avtomobilist Yekaterinburg players
Lokomotiv Yaroslavl players
Metallurg Novokuznetsk players
HC Neftekhimik Nizhnekamsk players
Russian ice hockey forwards
HC Ryazan players
HC Sibir Novosibirsk players
Sokol Krasnoyarsk players
Sportspeople from Penza
HC Yugra players